The roots of the Orton Ceramic Foundation date back to the establishment of the "Standard Pyrometric Cone Company" in 1896 by Edward J. Orton, Jr. In 1894, he was appointed the first Chairman of the Ceramic Engineering Department at Ohio State University, the first ceramic engineering school in the United States.

Orton died in 1932. In accordance with his will a charitable trust was created to continue the "Standard Pyrometric Cone Company," now known as the "Edward Orton Jr. Ceramic Foundation", the "Orton Ceramic Foundation" or simply "Orton."  Based in Westerville, Ohio, USA, it has three areas of products and services:

 Produce for monitoring thermal processing.
 Design and build analytical for measuring thermal properties.
 Provide to measure thermal properties.

References

Organizations based in Ohio
Westerville, Ohio
Design companies established in 1896
1896 establishments in Ohio